Arianagnathus is an extinct genus of conodonts, possibly in the family Balognathidae. The type species A. jafariani is from the Silurian Niur Formation in Iran.

References

External links 

Prioniodontida genera
Silurian conodonts